Gibraltar is a town in Door County, Wisconsin, United States. The population was 1,021 at the 2010 census. The unincorporated communities of Fish Creek and Juddville are located in the town.

Geography
According to the United States Census Bureau, the town has a total area of 151.4 square miles (392.2 km), of which, 33.8 square miles (87.7 km) of it is land and 117.6 square miles (304.6 km) of it (77.65%) is water.

Demographics
As of the census of 2000, there were 1,063 people, 475 households, and 328 families residing in the town. The population density was 31.4 people per square mile (12.1/km). There were 1,159 housing units at an average density of 34.2 per square mile (13.2/km). The racial makeup of the town was 97.93% White, 0.19% African American, 0.19% Native American, 0.19% Asian, 0.94% from other races, and 0.56% from two or more races. Hispanic or Latino of any race were 1.60% of the population.

There were 475 households, out of which 19.8% had children under the age of 18 living with them, 62.3% were married couples living together, 4.6% had a female householder with no husband present, and 30.9% were non-families. 25.3% of all households were made up of individuals, and 8.2% had someone living alone who was 65 years of age or older. The average household size was 2.24 and the average family size was 2.65.

In the town, the population was spread out, with 16.1% under the age of 18, 4.9% from 18 to 24, 21.6% from 25 to 44, 38.1% from 45 to 64, and 19.3% who were 65 years of age or older. The median age was 48 years. For every 100 females, there were 102.9 males. For every 100 females age 18 and over, there were 104.1 males.

The median income for a household in the town was $47,604, and the median income for a family was $58,125. Males had a median income of $31,607 versus $26,625 for females. The per capita income for the town was $29,755. About 1.8% of families and 4.2% of the population were below the poverty line, including 2.8% of those under age 18 and 1.0% of those age 65 or over.

Education
Gibraltar Area Schools several areas in the town. Gibraltar Elementary School and Gibraltar Secondary School are the two schools.

Climate

Gallery

References

External links
Town of Gibraltar

Towns in Door County, Wisconsin
Towns in Wisconsin